The following is a list of lists of villains, supervillains, enemies, and henchmen:

Lists of villains

By adversary 
 List of Aquaman enemies
 List of Avengers enemies
 List of Batman family enemies
 List of Blue Beetle enemies
 List of Bulletman enemies
 List of Captain America enemies
 List of Daredevil enemies
 List of Dhruva enemies
 List of Dick Tracy villains
 List of Doctor Who villains
 List of Doctor Who henchmen
 List of Fantastic Four enemies
 List of Firestorm enemies
 List of Flash enemies
 List of Green Arrow enemies
 List of Green Lantern enemies
 List of Hawkman enemies
 List of Iron Man enemies
 List of James Bond villains
 List of Justice League enemies
 List of Justice Society of America enemies
 List of Legion of Super-Heroes enemies
 List of Metal Men enemies
 List of My Little Pony villains
 List of Ninja Turtles: The Next Mutation villains
 List of Power Rangers villains
 Villains in Mighty Morphin Power Rangers
 List of Spawn villains
 List of Spider-Man enemies
 List of Super Friends villains
 List of Superman enemies
 List of Teen Titans enemies
 List of Thor (Marvel Comics) enemies
 List of Wonder Woman enemies
 List of X-Men enemies

By franchise 
 List of Ben 10 villains
 List of Buffyverse villains and supernatural beings
 List of Disney villains
 List of Pugad Baboy villains
 List of villains in Lois & Clark: The New Adventures of Superman
 List of villains in VR Troopers
 List of villains in Willard Price's Adventure series

Other 
 AFI's 100 Years...100 Heroes & Villains
 List of comic book supervillain debuts
 List of female action heroes and villains
 List of female supervillains
 List of Filipino supervillains
 List of horror film villains
 List of Secret Society of Super Villains members
 List of Sinister Six members
 List of soap opera villains

See also

 List of superheroines
 Lists of superheroes
 List of people known as the Cruel